Winifred Beamish and Kitty McKane defeated Germaine Golding and Suzanne Lenglen 6–4, 7–5 to win the women's doubles tennis title at the 1923 World Hard Court Championships. Lenglen and Elizabeth Ryan were the defending champions, with Ryan not participating this year.

Draw

Draw

References

Women's Doubles